Eduardo Pimentel (born 18 May 1961) is a Colombian footballer. He played in seven matches for the Colombia national football team in 1991. He was also part of Colombia's squad for the 1991 Copa América tournament.

References

External links
 

1961 births
Living people
Colombian footballers
Colombia international footballers
Place of birth missing (living people)
Association football midfielders
Boyacá Chicó managers